The Chief of Navy is the most senior appointment in the Royal Malaysian Navy and has been held by a four-star officer in the rank of Admiral since 2002. The Chief of Navy is a member of the Malaysian Armed Forces Council and directly reports to the Chief of Defence Forces.

The current Chief of Navy is Laksamana Datuk Abdul Rahman bin Ayob who succeeded Laksamana Tan Sri Mohd Reza Mohd Sany on 27 January 2023.

Appointees

See also 

 Royal Malaysian Navy
 Chief of Defence Forces
 Chief of Army (Malaysia)
 Chief of Air Force (Malaysia)

References 
 kepimpinan - Tentera Laut Diraja Malaysia (in Malay)

Royal Malaysian Navy
Military of Malaysia
Ministry of Defence (Malaysia)